Parliamentary elections were held in Hungary between 26 January and 4 February 1905. The result was a victory for the Party of Independence and '48, marking the first time the Liberal Party had lost power since 1875. Because of bad decisions after the elections, the Parliament was dissolved in 1906. Franz Joseph I of Austria ignored the result and instead of the victorious allied opposition he kept István Tisza in power, and then on 18 June he nominated baron Géza Fejérváry mashal (the captain of his Hungarian bodyguards) as acting Prime Minister, which deepened the crisis.

Results

Aftermath
The 27 Liberal dissidents led by Gyula Andrássy JR. founded the National Constitutional Party at the end of 1905.

Parliamentary
Hungary
Elections in Hungary
Elections in Austria-Hungary
Hungary
Hungary

hu:Magyarországi országgyűlési választások a dualizmus korában#1905